Oakland station most commonly refers to a public transit station representing Oakland, California:

Oakland – Jack London Square station
Oakland Coliseum station
Oakland International Airport station

Oakland station may also refer to:
Oakland station (Maryland)
Oakland City station, in Georgia

Other stations in Oakland, California 
West Oakland station
19th Street Oakland station

See also 
Transportation in Oakland, California
Oaklands railway station